The Belgian Cricket Federation (BCF), currently branded as Cricket Belgium, is the governing body of the sport of cricket in Belgium. Founded in 1990, the organisation has been a member of the International Cricket Council (ICC) since 1991, and is also a member of the European Cricket Council (ECC) and the Belgian Olympic Committee. Its headquarters are in Edegem, a municipality in the province of Antwerp. A previous national governing body had been established in the early 20th century, but fell away during the Second World War.

History

In one of those curious twists of history, this actually pre-dates Belgium itself by some 16 years. British Guards officers performed the honours, playing a match shortly before the Battle of Waterloo in 1815. Matches have been played to mark the 150th, 175th and 200th anniversaries of this occasion. The first record of organized cricket, however, can be found in a painting (left) dated 1870 which now hangs in the Pavilion at Lord”s.

Registered under Belgian law as a non-profit organization and operating as Cricket Belgium, it is the second Belgian Cricket Federation. The first was formed in the early 1900s and disappeared on the death of its long-term official Comte Joseph d’Oultremont in October 1942. No records have been found. Formed again in 1990, Belgium gained the status of an affiliate member of the ICC in 1991. The present Belgian Cricket Federation was a founding member of the European Cricket Council (ECC) and is now an Associate member of the International Cricket Council (ICC) and the Belgian Olympic and Inter-federal Committee (BOIC).

Although cricket is thought to have originated in what is now Belgium in about the 14th century, the first recorded match was played at Enghien six days before the Battle of Waterloo in 1815.

Mission and Vision

Given below is how Belgian cricket has defined its Mission Statement

As the governing body of cricket in Belgium we serve the Belgian Cricket community by providing high quality opportunities for playing cricket, providing cricket development opportunities for all ages, provide targeted performance based support to member clubs, promote the game of Cricket in the different regions of Belgium, deliver ‘major’ cricketing events with an organized and competitive cricket league, is open to all irrespective of age, gender, ethnicity or disability and provide a social environment that welcomes playing members and non-playing enthusiasts alike.

Given below is how Belgian cricket has defined its Vision Statement

To promote and develop cricket in Belgium by increasing the visibility of the game by taking it to the schools and the local community, promote transparency of the federation’s functioning and maintain clear and sustained communication with the cricketing fraternity. Improve cricketing facilities/infrastructure across the country, create financial sustenance by actively working towards securing a sponsor to generate non-ICC income for funding cricket development in Belgium. Actively work towards establishing partnerships with local councils and the various national sports governing bodies in order to maximize the footprint of the game. Significantly improve the results of the national senior, junior and women’s team’s performances at European and Global level.

Club cricket in Belgium

More and more clubs were formed in the 1950s, 1970s, 1980s and 1990s. Today, 18 clubs and one school are members of either the Belgian Cricket Federation or its regional Flemish organisation Cricket Vlaanderen. In addition, there are a number of teams representing businesses and other organizations playing in a mid-week T20 competition and other non-League events.

International Cricket Matches

On the European stage, Belgium has been a committed supporter of the ECC and ICC-Europe for many years with senior national teams taking part in championships and, since 2001, sending junior national sides to European Championships as well. Belgium is the current holder of the ICC-Europe Under-19 Division 2 title and has previously held Under-13 and Under-17 titles.

In 2011 the senior focus will shift towards T20 cricket in preparation for the new ICC-Europe Championship format.

Belgium hosted 12 countries for the ICC-Europe T20 Championships Division 2 in June 2013 and 5 nation European Cricket One-day U19 Tournament in August 2015.

A women’s cricket competition is held at Royal Brussels CC each year with a team selected to play home and away matches against Thoiry (Paris).

Grounds

See also
 Belgium national cricket team
 Belgium women's national cricket team
 Belgium national under-19 cricket team

References

External links
Official website

Cricket administration
Cricket
Sports organizations established in 1990
1990 establishments in Belgium
Sport in Ghent